The National Library of Laos (Lao language: ຫໍສະໝຸດແຫ່ງຊາດ) is in Vientiane, Laos. It was established in 1956. Starting in October 2007, the library has collaborated with the University of Passau and the Berlin State Library (Staatsbibliothek zu Berlin Preußischer Kulturbesitz) to create the Digital Library of Lao Manuscripts (ໂຄງການຫໍສະໝຸດດິຈິຕອລໜັງສືໃບລານລາວ). The government of the Lao People's Democratic Republic has granted permission for the manuscript collection to be made accessible via the Internet.

See also 
 List of national libraries

References

External links 
 

Libraries in Laos
Laos